The Lake Baratz (Lago di Baratz in Italian, Lagu de Baratz in Sardinian) is a lake in the Province of Sassari, Sardinia, Italy. At an elevation of 24 m, its surface area is 0.6 km². It is the only natural freshwater lake in Sardinia.
It is located inside the Municipality of Sassari, near Alghero.

Lakes of Sardinia